American Wake a 2004 album by The Elders.

American Wake may also refer to:

Music
American Wake (album), by Patrick Clifford
American Wake, a 2004 album by The Elders
"American Wake (The Nova Scotia Set)", part of the Riverdance stage show
"American Wake," song by Black 47

Other uses
 American Wake (book), a 1995 book by poet Greg Delanty
 American Wake (film), a 2004 film by Maureen Foley

See also 
 American Wake (ceremony), a send-off party thrown in Ireland when a loved one left the country